2008 Silverstone GP2 Series round was a GP2 Series motor race held on 5 and 6 July 2008 at Silverstone Circuit, United Kingdom. It was the fifth round of the 2008 GP2 Series season. The race weekend supported the 2008 British Grand Prix.

Classification

Qualifying

Feature race

Sprint race

References

Silverstone
GP2